Descartes Island may refer to:

Descartes Island (Antarctica)
Descartes Island (Western Australia)